Jack Eagle (January 15, 1926 – January 10, 2008) was an American actor. He was best known for his work in television commercials, including his role as Brother Dominic in a Super Bowl commercial for Xerox.

Eagle was born in Brooklyn, New York, on January 15, 1926. He initially worked as a trumpet player during the big-band era, and began working in commercials during the early 1960s. Eagle was working as a comedian in the Borscht Belt when he made the first Xerox commercial as Brother Dominic, which first 
aired during Super Bowl IX. More commercials followed; Brother Dominic became the company's mascot, and Eagle said in 1978 that he had made more money from commercials in the previous two years than in his entire career. He signed a three-year contract to promote Xerox in person to customers and its employees. Other notable commercial roles included "Mr. Cholesterol" in commercials for Fleischmann's margarine during the 1970s.

Jack Eagle's son is sportscaster Ian Eagle. Jack Eagle died in New York City on January 10, 2008, at the age of 81.

References

External links

1926 births
2008 deaths
People from Brooklyn
American male film actors
American male television actors
Male actors from New York (state)
20th-century American male actors
Jewish American comedians